This article presents the filmography of Tiku Talsania.

Filmography

As actor

Voice actor

TV Shows

References

Male actor filmographies
Indian filmographies